The 1989–90 Illinois State Redbirds men's basketball team represented Illinois State University during the 1989–90 NCAA Division I men's basketball season. The Redbirds, led by first year head coach Bob Bender, played their first full season of home games at Redbird Arena and were members of the Missouri Valley Conference.

The Redbirds finished the season 18–13, 9–5 in conference play to finish in a three-way tie for second place. They were the number two seed for the Missouri Valley Conference tournament by virtue of holding tie-breakers over Creighton University and Tulsa University. They defeated Drake University in the quarterfinal round, Creighton University in the semifinal round, and Southern Illinois University in the final round to win the championship (their second in the conference).

The Redbirds won the conference autobid to the 1990 NCAA Division I men's basketball tournament. They were assigned to the West Regional as the number fourteen seed and lost to the University of Michigan in the first round.

Roster

Schedule

|-
!colspan=9 style=|Exhibition Season

|-
!colspan=9 style=|Regular Season

|-
!colspan=9 style=|PepsiMissouri Valley Conference {MVC} tournament

|-
!colspan=9 style=|National Collegiate Athletic Association {NCAA} tournament

References

Illinois State Redbirds men's basketball seasons
Illinois State
Illinois State
Illinois State Men's Basketball
Illinois State Men's Basketball